This is a list of Internet challenges.

List

 Banana Sprite Challenge – a challenge to quickly eat two bananas and drink one can of Sprite without vomiting. There are other versions of the challenge, but the suggested premise is that the body cannot digest both substances at the same time. While the vomit response is commonly assumed to be a chemical reaction between the two foods, the reaction may also occur due simply to the large amount of food and drink ingested within a short period. Dietitian Heather Boline observes that the human stomach can only hold around two cups, saying "Too much food or liquid in your stomach if your stomach doesn’t have that capability can make you vomit." Thus, the vomiting response is likely due to the volume of food and drink being higher than the volume of the stomach.
 Benadryl Challenge - A challenge involving taking dangerous amounts of Benadryl, to achieve a high, and experience hallucinations. Several teenagers had been hospitalized as a result of participating in the challenge, and one teenager from Oklahoma had reportedly died.
 Bird Box Challenge – For its film Bird Box, where a significant plot element has characters keeping themselves blindfolded to prevent insanity, Netflix partnered with Twitch streamers to challenge them to play video games blindfolded. However, the challenge morphed into people attempting everyday activities fully blindfolded while being recorded, which included attempting to cook, walk in busy streets, and drive cars. Several of these videos have gone viral, but others repeating the challenges have gotten themselves into a number of non-fatal injuries. Netflix and law officials have issued warnings that people should only perform Bird Box challenges in safe, isolated places to eliminate the potential to injure themselves and others.
 Blackout Challenge/Choking Game - A challenge involving deliberately tying belts, cords, and other ligatures around ones neck, for the purpose of experiencing a "high". While the blackout challenge did not originate on the Internet, it had resurfaced in popularity on TikTok during the COVID-19 pandemic. Several participants, mainly children and teenagers, had been hospitalized, and seven children had reportedly died.
 Book Bucket Challenge – A variant of so-called Ice Bucket Challenge with an Indian origin. It went viral on social media during August–September 2014. The original Ice Bucket Challenge involved participants pouring a bucket of ice over their head or donating money to the ALS Association. The Book Bucket Challenge involves people sharing the names of 10 books that inspired them on their social networking pages or donating books to the needy and sharing those photos with friends on social networking sites.
 Bottle Cap Challenge – A martial arts challenge where one must kick the bottle cap off without knocking over the bottle itself.
 Cameron Boyce Challenge – After Cameron Boyce passed away at age 20, a new challenge became trending as people mimicked the symptoms of epileptic seizure that led to his death. Fans called out this challenge as obscene, considering it an insult to his immediate family and to everyone with epilepsy.
 Charlie Charlie Challenge – A ouija-emulating ritual in which the spirit of a Mexican demon named "Charlie" is invoked via two pencils in the shape of a cross and the words "yes" and "no" written on paper in a square. Social media users began circulating videos of pencils moving to the word "yes" when asking if the demon is present.
 Cheesed Challenge – A Twitter trend. Parents film themselves tossing cheese slices at their babies.
 Cinnamon challenge – A viral Internet food challenge. The objective of the challenge is to film oneself swallowing a spoonful of ground cinnamon in under 60 seconds without drinking anything, then upload the video to the Internet. The challenge is difficult and carries substantial health risks because the cinnamon coats and dries the mouth and throat, resulting in coughing, gagging, vomiting, and inhaling of cinnamon, leading to throat irritation, breathing difficulties, and risk of pneumonia or a collapsed lung.
 Condom challenge – A viral Internet challenge. The challenge involves inserting a latex condom into the nostril and snorting it into the nasal cavity and back through the throat to be coughed out of the mouth.  The term "condom challenge" was coined in May 2012 following the widespread popularity of the cinnamon challenge, but the idea is several years old and videos of challenge attempts date to at least 2007. The challenge went viral in April 2013, when WorldStarHipHop posted a video of two young women attempting the challenge, and several people subsequently uploaded videos onto the Internet of themselves attempting the challenge. The stunt poses potential choking hazards.
 Coronavirus Challenge – the challenge involves licking various surfaces such as door handles and even public toilet bowls. At least one person who took the challenge was reported to have contracted COVID-19.
 Devious lick – a trend, popular among teenagers, that involves stealing object(s) from school, such as soap, sanitizers etc.
 Eraser Challenge – a trend popular among school children where one rubs an eraser on their bare skin as hard as they can while reciting the English alphabet. This forceful rubbing action can cause friction burns and scars to the skin if prolonged, and put the affected area at risk of infection, thus leading to parental concerns.
 Everywhere at the End of Time – A challenge in which people listen to this six-hour album set from Leyland James Kirby, a sonic depiction of dementia that features early 20th-century recordings (most prominently the 1931 song "Heartaches") slowly become more degraded and jumbled until it devolves into noise in line with a dementia patient's memory and cognitive function. It emerged as an Internet challenge in 2020. Kirby was strongly in favor of the challenge as a way to raise awareness of dementia.
 Fire challenge – an activity which refers to the application of flammable liquids to one's body and then setting the liquids aflame, while being video recorded. The aftermath is then posted to social media sites. Firefighters, police officers and media sources have chastised and spoken out against the activity, hoping to dissuade individuals from trying it due to its harmful nature. In 2021, a TikTok variant of this challenge involves drawing shapes on the bare skin using any flammable substance (typically alcohol) and lighting it on fire, resulting in similar consequences to the original.
 Food challenge – examples include the gallon challenge or the Saltine cracker challenge, are specific challenges or competitions involving food. These may occur as part of competitive eating or as an online challenge. For example, the dare of the cinnamon challenge meme is to attempt to eat a specified amount of ground cinnamon within a minute and then also post the video online, like a chain letter.
 Food Stamp or SNAP Challenge – a trend in the United States popularized by religious groups, community activists and food pantries, in which a family of means chooses to purchase food using only the monetary equivalent of what a family that size would receive in the US federal government Supplemental Nutrition Assistance Program (SNAP), colloquially called food stamps. In 2015, this amounted to US$194.00 per person per month, or nearly $7.00 per day.
 Gallon smashing – A challenge which surfaced on YouTube in 2013, gallon smashing involves obtaining bottles of liquid in a supermarket (usually cow's milk or water) and then throwing them against the floor and spilling their contents in such a way that the act is seen to be accidental rather than deliberate. The participant may attempt to damage other objects as they throw the bottles or fall into the resultant spill and seek the assistance of customers to help them up. Participants of this challenge often sustain injuries and frequently face punishment from legal authorities, including the two teenagers who originally started the phenomenon.
 Happy slapping – a fad in Europe around 2005, mostly in the UK and France, where people randomly attacked others in public and had themselves filmed. Multiple people were killed as a result of these incidents. An "anti happy-slapping" law enacted as a response to the fad in France resulted in a debate about censorship.
 Ice Bucket Challenge – A charity-driven effort where a person "tags" three other people over social media, challenging them either to donate $100 to the ALS Association, or to otherwise douse themselves with a bucket of ice-cold water while filming themselves as well as making a smaller donation and tagging three others with the same challenge. As the challenge propagated, it tagged various celebrities and people with large numbers of social followers, causing the challenge to grow in a viral manner.
 I Will Survive coronavirus challenge – Named after Gloria Gaynor's hit song, the aim is to encourage people to properly wash their hands in light of the coronavirus pandemic. The iconic singer made a video that has since gone viral on TikTok.
 Kylie Jenner Lip Challenge – Based on trying to recreate the full lips of television star Kylie Jenner, Internet users show themselves using a small vessel like a shot glass that covers their lips, drawing all the air out of the vessel, and then releasing, which temporarily puffs the lips by drawing the user's blood into them. The activity is considered harmful, both from bruising and dis-figuration of the lips, and the potential for the vessel to shatter and cut the person.
 Mannequin Challenge – a viral Internet video trend that started in October 2016 where people remain still while a video is recorded, usually with music in the background, most commonly "Black Beatles" by Rae Sremmurd. It became especially popular with sports teams and athletes.
 No Nut November is an internet challenge revolving around abstinence, in which participants abstain from masturbation and ejaculation, or colloquially "to nut", during the month of November. It originated in the early 2010s and grew in popularity on social media during and after 2017.
 Orbeez Challenge – Involves shooting people with gel blasters using water beads such as Orbeez. Some of uses of the phrase "Orbeez Challenge" only involve playing with the beads, not shooting.
 Penny Outlet Challenge – A year after YouTube announced its ban on extremely dangerous challenges videos, users migrated to TikTok to share their videos of the new viral challenge. A participants plugs a phone charger partly into an outlet, then touches a penny to the exposed prongs between the phone charger and the electrical socket, causing sparks and electrical damage and potentially starting a fire on the connected circuit. The Massachusetts State Fire Marshal issued a letter warning fire departments and schools regarding the challenge after three independent incidents in Massachusetts, two of which reportedly resulted in criminal charges. In December 2021, Amazon Alexa suggested the challenge to a 10-year-old. Alexa had reportedly taken the Penny Challenge from an online resource that specifically warned that the challenge was dangerous. Amazon later stated the problem had been fixed.
 Planking - An internet phenomenon which emerged in 2011, which involved lying face down in peculiar and humorous locations.
 Running Man Challenge – A series of dance videos originally created by Hillside, New Jersey high school students Kevin Vincent and Jeremiah Hall on Instagram that uses the song "My Boo" by Ghost Town DJ's.
Sailor Moon redraw challenge – in this challenge artists redraw a screenshot of Sailor Moon, the character from the series of the same name, in their own art styles. Alternatively, the scene is redrawn with another fictional character taking her place.

 Salt and ice challenge – Internet phenomenon wherein participants pour salt on their bodies, usually on the arm and ice is then placed on the salt. This causes a "burning" sensation, and participants are challenged to withstand the pain for as long as they can. The challenge is recorded and posted on YouTube or other forms of social media. This challenge has caused many burns as a result.
 Skull Breaker Challenge – A TikTok challenge that went viral in February 2020 and spread to other sections of the internet. The challenge involves two people convincing another person to jump, and then kick their legs out, causing the person jumping to fall on their head. Several people have been hospitalized after performing this challenge.
 Tide Pod Challenge – Similar to other eating challenges, this saw people attempt to eat Tide Pods, small packets filled with laundry detergent and other chemicals that normally dissolve while in a washing machine. The challenge gained attention in late 2017 and early 2018, and quickly was addressed by several health-related organizations, as the chemicals in the packet are poisonous and toxic to humans. These agencies sought to warn users and strongly discourage the challenge after dozens of cases of poisoning were reported within the first few weeks of 2018, while YouTube took action to remove videos related to the challenge to further stop its spread.
 Trashtag Challenge – An environmental challenge encouraging people to clean-up litter and post before/after photos. The challenge went viral in 2019 and is part of a movement to clean up litter and trash from the outdoors. Organizations that are actively involved in the challenge include National CleanUp Day, Earth Day, Keep America Beautiful, and World Cleanup Day.
 Vacuum Challenge - A challenge which emerged in 2019, where parents would have their children sit in a garbage bag with their knees against their chest, and vacuum seal the bag, giving the appearance of a skin tight latex bodysuit. The challenge poses a possible asphyxiation hazard, as well as possible bodily harm caused by an airtight bag.
 Yoga Challenge – A continuing YouTube video trend that first went viral during the summer of 2014 involving participants who attempt to perform a series of acroyoga poses that are taken from the internet. Typically, participants are not trained in yoga, which results in humorous outcomes (awkward stances, falling down, etc.). These attempts are captured on film, usually on a smartphone or tablet camera, and uploaded to YouTube. Usually, prior to attempting a pose, participants will show an image of the pose they are attempting. The contrast between correct poses by professionals and incorrect poses by amateurs adds to the humor. YouTuber Alfie Deyes posted a video titled The Yoga Challenge! in June 2014 which may have set off the trend. Deyes' video may have been inspired by various popular "couples' stunts" and "yoga fail" videos by channels such as BFvsGF posted as early as 2012. BFvsGF reattempted the trend by posting a video titled "Acro Yoga Challenge" in July 2014. The "challenge" part may stem from the "30-Day yoga challenge" that was a popular fitness vlogging trend on YouTube as early as the mid-2000s.

References 

History of the Internet

Internet-related lists